{{Speciesbox
| image = Cerambycidae - Tithoes confinis.JPG
| image_caption = From western Africa
| taxon = Tithoes confinis
| authority = (Laporte de Castelnau, 1840)
| synonyms =  
Acanthophorus confinis Laporte de Castelnau, 1840
Tithoes crassipes Quedenfeldt, 1882
Tithoes falcatus Kolbe, 1898
Tithoes gnatho Kolbe, 1898
Tithoes gularis Kolbe, 1898
Tithoes intermedius Thomson, 1877
Tithoes longicornis Kolbe, 1898
Tithoes mandibularis Thomson, 1877
Acanthophorus maculatus (Fabricius) Gerstaecker, 1862

}}Tithoes confinis, common name giant longhorn beetle, is a species of beetle of the family Cerambycidae.

This beetle has a massive hairy body and strong mandibles. The basic colour is dark brown. Pronotum bears two spines on both edges. Adults are nocturnal. Larvae feed on cashew nut trees (Anacardium occidentale'') and other trees of the family Anacardiaceae.

Distribution
This widespread species can be found in forests through most of the continental Afrotropics (Djibouti, Ethiopia, Kenya, Malawi, Mozambique, Somalia, South Africa, Tanzania, Uganda, Zambia and Zimbabwe).

References
 Biolib
 F. VITALI - Cerambycoidea

Prioninae
Beetles described in 1840